The Port Adelaide and District Football Association (PADFA) was an Australian rules football competition based in the western and north-western suburbs of Adelaide, South Australia until it folded at the end of the 1952 season.

It was first formed in 1921 as the Port Adelaide and Suburban Football Association under the auspices of the Port Adelaide Y.M.C.A., initially as a church based competition.

Following World War I, the association reformed, between 1921 and 1923 was known as the Port Adelaide and Suburban Church Football Association, and in 1924 was renamed the Port Adelaide and District Football Association.

Controversy 
 The competition made the news in 1915 when late during the Grand Final, an Ethelton player kicked his Port Catholic opponent after he was beaten to the ball. Multiple fights broke out on the field as a result. Ethelton, who held a small margin at the time, lost the lead, and as a result, the match. When the siren sounded, several hundred spectators stormed the ground fighting. A number of people were injured. Ethelton went on to win the Challenge Final for the Premiership the following week.
 The association came into potential legal trouble in 1923 when a group of footballers calling themselves the "Rosewater Catholics" nominated a team in the place of the existing club of that name. The existing Rosewater Catholic club that participated in the previous season were instructed to adopt a new name to avoid confusion. Father Gearon, the Parish Priest of Rosewater, was given special permission to state his case for his team and not the new team. It is not known which team eventually participated as Rosewater Catholic.

Member Clubs

Premierships

A-Grade 
1911 - Albert Park  
1912
1913 - Ethelton 
1914 - Port Catholic  
1915 - Ethelton
1916–19 - in recess (World War I)
1920 - Rosewater 
1921 - Rosewater
1922 - Rosewater
1923 - Port Adelaide Church United  
1924 - Ethelton
1925 - Alberton Church United
1926 - Albert Park 
1927 - Albert Park 
1928 - Rosatala Church United  
1929 - Rosewater
1930 - Semaphore 
1931 - Rosatala 
1932 - Kilkenny United
1933 - Riverside 
1934 - Riverside 
1935 - Riverside
1936 - Riverside 
1937 - Riverside 
1938 - Birkenhead Sports  
1939 
1940
1941 
1942–46 - in recess (World War II)
1947
1948 - Rosewater 
1949 - Semaphore Park
1950 - Semaphore Park
1951
1952

Medallists 
 President's Medal
 1923 - L. Graves (Rosatala Church United)
 1925 - H. Penn (Rosewater)
 1926 - K. T. Williams (Alberton Methodist)
 1928 - T. Waye (Rosatala Church United)
 S. Hosking Medal
 1929 - J. Howe (Semaphore Central B)
 President's Medal
 1930 - V. Williams (Queenstown)

Leading Goalkickers 
 1923 - J. Wallace (Semaphore Church United) 
 1925 - J. Simon (Rosatala Church United) - 40

References 

1911 establishments in Australia
1952 disestablishments in Australia
Defunct Australian rules football competitions in South Australia